The Hemet News was a newspaper in Hemet, California, published from about 1894 until 1999.

Ownership

Independent
Joseph P. Kerr was editor and publisher from 1894 to 1897. He died of consumption on November 9, 1897, at the age of 32.
Frank Fowler and Will J. Tinker of San Jacinto became lessees in that year.

Peter Milliken of Lexington, Michigan, became editor and publisher in  1907, and R.C. Wall of the same city succeeded him in 1912. The latter died of a hemorrhage of the lungs on January 28, 1912, having owned the paper for just four months.

John E. King was publisher from 1912 to 1938. He came to California in 1912, where he took a half interest in the newspaper, sharing the ownership with the estate of Lydia A. Monroe (Mrs. H.H. Monroe) of Riverside.

Homer D. King was acting publisher in 1925 while his father, John E., was in Sacramento, and he was editor and manager from about 1937 until the father's death, when the son took over as publisher. The latter was editor and publisher until shortly before he died in 1961.

James W. Gill, who had been advertising manager, became a partner in the business in 1942 and was sole owner in 1960. He helped to transition the paper from a weekly to a semiweekly in 1956, to three times a week in 1961 and six days a week in 1967. At that time it was noted as being "one of the few remaining independently owned newspapers in the state."

During Gill's tenure at the newspaper, it moved two times to larger quarters, expanding fivefold in space, employees and circulation.

In  1961, it was said that the Hemet News was "undoubtedly making more money" than any California newspaper of a comparable size. The Thursday edition usually had at least 24 pages and carried four to six full pages of advertising.

Group
The Hemet News, which at that time was a daily newspaper of 22,000 circulation, was sold by James Gill III to Donrey Media Group, on February 29, 1988, along with weeklies San Jacinto Valley Register, Moreno Valley Butterfield Express and Riverside County News Advertiser. Gill was to remain as publisher "with a long-term agreement."

Nevertheless, on May 1, 1989, longtime newspaper executive Thomas Woodrow Reeves was transferred from the Donrey-owned Ukiah Daily Journal to become publisher of the Hemet News. Later Reeves also became a Donrey division manager responsible for the Redlands Daily Facts, Moreno Valley Times and Alamogordo Daily News. Gill became a Donrey assistant vice president.

Ten years later, by 1999, newspaper magnate William Dean Singleton had formed an arrangement with others to extend ownership over a group of newspapers that included the Inland Valley Daily Bulletin of Ontario, the Valley Times of Moreno, the Redlands Daily Facts and the Hemet News.

In that year, A.H. Belo Corporation agreed to acquire the assets of the Hemet News and the Moreno Valley Times from California Newspaper Partnership, composed of Singleton's Denver-based MediaNews Group Inc. and Donrey Media Group of Arkansas.. At that point, the News had declined to a daily circulation of 11,660 and 12,250 on Sundays. Belo, based in Dallas, Texas, owned the Riverside Press-Enterprise and The Dallas Morning News, along with several television stations.

An announcement of the deal said the Hemet News would be discontinued as a separate newspaper but its pages would be delivered as a supplement to the Press-Enterprise of Riverside, California.

"It's a sad day when a newspaper dies, and The Hemet News is going to be out of business," said the News's publisher, Jim Fredericks, who was set to become publisher of the new supplement, which would cover both Hemet and San Jacinto.

Marcia McQuern, president of the Press-Enterprise Company, said the action would result in "more local news for readers."

Al McCombs, who had been publisher of the Chino Champion for 44 years, wrote that the News had been "swallowed up" into the Riverside Press-Enterprise like similar nearby newspapers which had thereby become "emasculated images of their former selves."

Notable journalism

Independent
On June 1, 1928, the newspaper published an article stating that the cities of Beaumont, Banning, Palm Springs, San Jacinto and Hemet would join together to "fight for better telephone service and lower electric light rates," resulting in denial by the Southwestern Home Telephone Company.

The newspaper published yearly special magazine editions to honor the annual Ramona Pageant in Hemet. In 1939, it distributed "one of the biggest weekly newspaper editions in California's history – 76 pages, the largest ever published in Riverside County." Later, the supplement became a 180-page magazine that won national and state awards.

Under the editorship of Homer D. King, the newspaper backed the development of the Hemet Valley Hospital District and the Hemet Farmers Fair.

Group

Scientology
The newspaper published a six-part series based on the claims of Ken Rose, who left the Church of Scientology after a membership of 10 years, that the church "runs its international operations from a state-of-the-art media center in this rural community."

The series included comments from church officials, former Scientologists, and analysts. A Hemet News editorial on July 14, said that "as the series unfolded, we had repeated visits from church officials. They were obviously concerned about what would be printed about them[,] and on each occasion our door was open to listen to those concerns."

The editorial said that before the series began "we received a letter from a prominent plaintiff's libel lawyer in New York City threatening us with a lawsuit if we ran certain accusations about the church."

Sex scandal
On March 18, 1993, the News ran an exclusive story that a Hemet High School football coach and his wife had been arrested for investigation of sexual activity with a minor. The news said it talked with four current football players and one former player, none of whose names were published. The school district hired extra guards to prevent news media from entering the high school campus.

References

Defunct newspapers published in California
Publications established in 1894
Publications disestablished in 1999
1894 establishments in California